H.A. Winston & Co., a.k.a. Winstons was a chain of restaurants centered in the Philadelphia, Pennsylvania, area in the 1970s and 1980s. The chain shut its last restaurant on July 14, 1992.

History
The first H.A. Winston & Co. restaurant opened in 1972 at Front and Chestnut Streets in Philadelphia. Initially, the restaurant was considered a singles bar that incidentally purveyed hamburgers and onion soup, but the chain soon grew popular as a casual dining establishment with restaurants in Pennsylvania, New Jersey, Delaware, and Virginia.

Company
The chain was owned by the Spivak brothers. The "H" in "H.A. Winston & Co." represents co-owner Herb Spivak, and the "A" for Allen Spivak; the story behind the name missing the third brother and co-owner Joseph “Jerry” Spivak is not documented. The brothers were also founders and principals of the Philadelphia-based concert promoter and power-house firm Electric Factory Concerts.

Products and services

Gourmet Burgers 
Quickly, H.A. Winston & Co. became famous for its 7- and 10-ounce hamburgers, collectively referred to as "GourmetBerger" whose numerous options for topping were referred to and ordered by either its topping number or name.

Toppings:
Winston- sauteed onions, peppers & mushrooms
American-American cheese, bacon, lettuce & tomato
Italian-mozzarella & marinara sauce
Society Hill- blue cheese & chives
Mexican-chili & chopped onions
Russian-sour cream & caviar

See also

References

Defunct restaurant chains in the United States